I søkelyset is a television series shown on TVNorge in 1990 and 1991 presented by Tore Sandberg. 

In the programme, the presenter put the searchlight onto unsolved crimes, where witnesses could ring in with tip-offs. The programme was made by Sandberg's own firm, Tore Sandberg A/S together with the Oslo police department.

TVNorge original programming
Crime in Norway
Norwegian documentary television series